Finn Haldorsen (5 September 1934 – February 4, 2005) was a Norwegian-born businessman.

Finn Haldorsen was the youngest of 13 children born to Haldor Haldorsen and Anne Serine Haldorsen in
Rubbestadneset, county of Hordaland,  Norway.  After completing schooling on Bømlo he attended college in Bryne, Norway. Following his military service, he went to work at a steel factory in Manchester, England. He started studying mechanical engineering at the University of Cardiff in Wales. After receiving his honours degree in 1961, he returned to Norway to start work at Wichmann Motorfabrikk AS, his father's engine factory.

Haldorsen was best known for starting the Rubb Group in Norway in 1968. Rubb Group was named for his home town of Rubbestadneset. Haldorsen's goal was to build a fabric covered building that would withstand the harsh Norwegian climate.  His success with this effort lead to him moving to England to start Rubb Buildings Ltd. in 1977.  When this company was firmly established under the leadership of Bill Wood, he moved to Maine, and established Rubb Inc. in the United States which today is under the leadership of David C. Nickerson.

Haldorsen was married, and had 3 sons and 1 daughter.

References

External links
Zurhaar & Rubb AS
Rubb Buildings Ltd website

1934 births
2005 deaths
People from Bømlo
American company founders
American manufacturing businesspeople
Norwegian company founders
Mechanical engineers
Technology company founders

20th-century American businesspeople